"Self Control" is a song by Italian singer Raf, released in 1984. It was written by Giancarlo Bigazzi, Steve Piccolo and Raf, and arranged by Celso Valli. The track topped the charts in Italy and Switzerland, and started the explosion and dominance of Italo disco-style recordings in continental European charts during the 1980s.

That same year, "Self Control" was covered by American singer Laura Branigan, whose version reached  1 in countries such as Austria, Canada, Germany and Switzerland, as well as No. 4 on the US Billboard Hot 100. Both versions of the song were commercially successful across Europe during much of the summer of 1984, with Branigan's rendition becoming the most successful single of the year in Germany and Switzerland.

"Self Control" has become one of the defining songs of the 1980s, with a number of remakes recorded each year. Notable covers include Puerto Rican singer Ricky Martin in 1993, a dance remake by Branigan in 2004, Royal Gigolos in 2005 and Danish dance group Infernal in 2006.

Raf version
Raf (born Raffaele Riefoli) co-wrote the song "Self Control" with Giancarlo Bigazzi and Steve Piccolo. His version of "Self Control" reached No. 1 in Italy for seven non-consecutive weeks. It also reached No. 1 in Switzerland, between runs at the top spot by Branigan's version of "Self Control", and peaked at No. 2 in Germany, No. 7 in Austria and No. 40 in France. Raf released an extended dance mix of the song, like Branigan, but Raf's version featured a rap (performed by two other rap vocalists), relatively rare for a white artist at the time.

He would release several more tracks in English and re-release his 1984 self-titled debut album in 1987 under the title Self Control, featuring two of these tracks. Although his English-language album and especially the singles proved to be successful in Italy and elsewhere, he began releasing his later albums in his native language, almost all of which were received better in Italy than the English-language albums; many of them charted within the top 10 in Italy.

Charts

Weekly charts

Year-end charts

Laura Branigan version

American singer Laura Branigan covered "Self Control" in 1984. It was released as the lead single from her third studio album of the same name, released the same year.

History
Branigan's first major hit had also been co-written by Bigazzi: "Gloria" (1982) was an English cover of the 1979 original Italian song recorded by Umberto Tozzi. The following year, Branigan recorded another English song written over a Tozzi and Bigazzi song, "Mama", which was included on her 1983 album Branigan 2. Branigan chose two more Italian songs for her third album: the first one, "Ti Amo" with lyrics by Diane Warren once again based on the original by Tozzi and Bigazzi that had been a 1977 single for Tozzi. The second one, "Self Control", became the title track to the album and her most successful single internationally. "Self Control" was the only one of the four Italian songs recorded by Branigan that was originally composed in English, and Branigan chose to record the song as written. Also, unlike the other songs, Branigan's version was contemporaneous with that of its co-writer.

Branigan's recording was arranged by Giorgio Moroder's protégé Harold Faltermeyer with Robbie Buchanan and produced by Buchanan with Jack White in West Germany and Los Angeles. A keyboard hook in Raf's version was changed to a guitar riff for Branigan's version and a vocal break was paired with a sharper and repeated percussive element.

Composition
The song narrates the singer's slip into the world of nightlife, the allure of which has her "livin' only for the night" and deeming herself to "live among the creatures of the night". Rather than actually invoking more self-control, the singer addresses someone: "you take my self, you take my self-control". According to Bryan Buss of AllMusic, the song is about "finding sex in the seamy side of town".

Chart performance
In the United States, Branigan's cover became her 3rd and last top 10 entry. In Canada, the track reached No. 1 on both the pop and AC charts. Both the Raf original and Branigan's version of "Self Control" entered the German top 20 in May 1984: on 25 June, Branigan's single attained the No. 1 position, where it remained for six weeks, while Raf's version occupied the No. 2 spot.

"Self Control" also topped the charts in Austria, Denmark, Finland, Portugal, South Africa and Sweden, while reaching No. 2 in Norway, No. 3 in Ireland, No. 3 in Australia and No. 5 in the UK.

Raf's version surpassed the success of Branigan's only in his native Italy, where her single reached No. 16. The only other territory where Raf topped the charts was in Switzerland. His single debuted in the Swiss top 30 at No. 7 on 17 June, the same week Branigan's version debuted at No. 24. The following week, Raf's single climbed to No. 2. Branigan's single, however, rose to No. 1. In their third week, Raf's version supplanted Branigan's at number 1, but she regained the top spot in the fourth week and the two versions would remain there, Branigan at No. 1 and Raf at No. 2, for three more weeks.

In their seventh week on the charts, Raf fell to No. 3, below "Wake Me Up Before You Go-Go" by Wham!, while Branigan held at No. 1. Their eighth week on the charts saw Raf regain the No. 2 spot behind Branigan. The following week the Wham! single moved back to No. 2 and Raf fell three spaces, but Branigan held firm. In their tenth week on the charts, Wham! fell to No. 5, Raf fell two more spots, and Branigan maintained pole position.

Finally, on the week of 26 August, "Such a Shame" by Talk Talk moved Branigan out of the number-one spot, though she would remain in the top five for another three weeks. Branigan's record spent a total of 16 weeks in the Swiss top 30, including 12 weeks in the top five and eight weeks at No. 1. Branigan's version eventually became the most successful single of 1984 in both Germany and Switzerland.

Music video
Branigan was one of the first artists of the video era to work with an Academy Award-winning film director on a music video when William Friedkin (The French Connection, The Exorcist) directed the clip. Filmed in New Jersey and New York City, the video was produced by Fred Caruso and first aired in April 1984.

The video drew controversy, and MTV requested some edits before it could air. Entertainment Tonight aired a segment on the network's reaction to the clip, which was being played in late-night slots on other networks. Though Branigan resisted at first, her record company convinced her to allow a minor alteration and the video was aired on MTV, though by this time the single had peaked on the charts. Branigan would go on to be nominated for a 1985 American Music Award for Favorite Pop/Rock Female Video Artist, losing to Cyndi Lauper.

Live performances
Branigan performed the song live in her debut on The Tonight Show Starring Johnny Carson on 27 April 1984. She also promoted the song during appearances on The Merv Griffin Show, Solid Gold (12 May 1984), Dick Clark's American Bandstand (9 June 1984) and the syndicated Dick Clark television special Rock Rolls On, which she also co-hosted.

Track listings
7-inch single
"Self Control" – 4:06
"Silent Partners" – 3:55

12-inch maxi single
"Self Control" (extended version) – 5:04
"Silent Partners" (extended version) – 4:10

Charts

Weekly charts

Year-end charts

Certifications

Re-releases

Branigan's "Self Control" was paired with follow-up single "The Lucky One" for an "oldies series" release in the US. In the UK, a similar release paired the song with her earlier single, "Gloria". In 1992, the original single mix of "Self Control" was re-released on CD single and 12-inch vinyl by Atlantic/WEA in Germany featuring two new remixes. One of those, the Classic Summer Mix, appeared on the European greatest hits album The Very Best of Laura Branigan. In 1999, four new remixes of "Self Control" were commissioned for a South African collection called Back in Control, on Atlantic/Gallo. "Self Control '99" was released as a CD single there. In the mid-2000s, several trance music remixes featuring samples of various lengths from the 1984 Branigan original surfaced from various entities including Crooklyn Clan, Imperial Machine, and SK featuring Branigan. None of these mixes were done with Branigan's participation.

As of 2010, the Self Control album remains in print and the original version can also be heard on The Best of Branigan (1993), and in remastered versions on The Essentials: Laura Branigan (2002) and The Platinum Collection (2006).

2004 version
Branigan sought to reclaim her career after years away from the music industry first to take care of her ailing husband and then to mourn his loss. She re-recorded her two biggest club hits for the 20th anniversary of "Self Control" and they were released in a slew of remixes as "Gloria 2004" and "Self Control 2004". The latter track reached the top 10 on the Billboard Hot Dance Singles Sales chart following Branigan's sudden death from an aneurysm in August of that year.

Track listings
CD maxi single
"Self Control 2004" (Mindworkers Radio Mix) – 3:21
"Self Control 2004" (Flip & Fill Remix) – 6:45
"Self Control 2004" (Mindworkers Remix) – 7:07
"Self Control 2004" (Force Four Remix) – 7:45
"Self Control 2004" (Kenny Hayes Club Mix) – 6:07
"Self Control 2004" (Mindworkers Instrumental) – 7:05

Charts

Ricky Martin version

In 1993, Ricky Martin recorded a Spanish-language cover of "Self Control", titled "Que Dia Es Hoy" ("What Day Is Today"). With lyrics by producer Juan Carlos Calderón and Mikel Herzog, the song was released as single from Martin's second studio solo album, Me Amaras, in 1993. The single featured a remixed version of the track. A music video was also released. In 2008, the remixed version was included on CD and DVD, called 17.

Track listings
Latin America promotional 12-inch single
"Que Dia Es Hoy (Self Control)" (Remix Extended Version) – 8:01
"Que Dia Es Hoy (Self Control)" (Remix Radio Version) – 4:52
"Que Dia Es Hoy (Self Control)" (Remix Extended Dub Version) – 6:03
"Que Dia Es Hoy (Self Control)" – 4:22

Brazilian promotional CD single
"Que Dia Es Hoy (Self Control)" (Club Mix) – 8:01
"Que Dia Es Hoy (Self Control)" (Club Mix Edit) – 4:52
"Que Dia Es Hoy (Self Control)" (Dub Mix) – 6:03
"Te Quero Amor (Que Dia Es Hoy)" – 4:22

Charts

Royal Gigolos version

In 2004, German dance group Royal Gigolos recorded a cover of "Self Control" for their debut studio album, Musique Deluxe. It was released as a CD maxi single the following year, along with their cover of the 1984 Rockwell song "Somebody's Watching Me". Their version reached the top 20 in Denmark and Finland.

Track listings
CD maxi single
"Self Control" (D.O.N.S. single mix) – 3:42
"Self Control" (single version) – 3:46
"Self Control" (extended version) – 5:05
"Self Control" (D.O.N.S. remix) – 6:18
"Self Control" (Swen G° remix) – 6:32
"Somebody's Watching Me" (single version) – 3:17
"Somebody's Watching Me" (extended version) – 4:27
"Somebody's Watching Me" (DJ Tyson club mix) – 6:36
"Self Control" (video)

Charts

Infernal version

In 2006, Danish dance group Infernal released a cover of the song on 6 November in the UK. The song debuted in the chart at No. 61 based on downloads only. The track was also released in Australia, as a double A-side with "I Won't Be Crying", though it did not chart there. Their recording reached the top 10 in Finland and their native Denmark.

Track listings
CD single
"Self Control" (Radio Edit) – 3:40
"From Paris to Berlin" (DJ Aligator Remix) – 6:37

Enhanced promotional CD single
"Self Control" (Radio Edit) – 3:40
"Self Control" (Extended Version) – 6:00
"Self Control" (Soul Seekerz Remix) – 7:40
"Self Control" (Robbie Rivera Juicy Mix) – 6:14
"Self Control" (Europeanz Remix) – 7:09
"Self Control" (Weekend Wonderz Club Mix) – 6:13
"Self Control" (Video) – 3:48

12-inch single
"Self Control" (Soul Seekerz Remix) – 7:41
"Self Control" (Extended Version) – 6:00
"Self Control" (Robbie Rivera Juicy Mix) – 6:14

Charts

Kendra Erika version
In 2018, American singer Kendra Erika released a cover of "Self Control", reaching number one on Billboard Dance Club Songs chart.

Track listings
The Remixes
"Self Control" (Dirty Werk Radio Mix) – 3:14
"Self Control" (Moto Blanco Radio Edit) – 3:06
"Self Control" (Ralphi Rosario & Erick Ibiza Radio Mix) – 3:56

Charts

Use in media
Branigan's version of "Self Control" was featured on the Miami Vice episode "The Great McCarthy" and was featured in the fact-based 1989 TV film The Preppie Murder and a 2007 episode of the series Cold Case. In 2002, the Branigan recording was used as a track on the fictional radio station Flash FM in the video game Grand Theft Auto: Vice City, and it appears on the CD collection Grand Theft Auto: Vice City Official Soundtrack Box Set, as well as numerous other hits collections. It was often used as bumper music by late night radio talk show host Art Bell when he hosted Coast to Coast AM in the 1990s. It was also featured in the opening scenes of the Knight Rider episodes "Halloween Knight" and "K.I.T.T vs K.A.R.R." In 2018, Branigan's version appeared in the episode "Descent" of FX's The Assassination of Gianni Versace: American Crime Story.

See also
 List of European number-one hits of 1984
 List of number-one singles of 1984 (Canada)
 List of number-one hits of 1984 (Germany)
 List of number-one hits of 1984 (Italy)
 List of number-one singles of the 1 980s (Switzerland)
 List of number-one dance singles of 2019 (U.S.)
 List of number-one singles and albums in Sweden

References

1984 songs
1984 debut singles
1992 singles
2004 singles
2005 singles
2006 singles
Atlantic Records singles
Carrere Records singles
European Hot 100 Singles number-one singles
Infernal (Danish band) songs
Italo disco songs
Laura Branigan songs
Number-one singles in Austria
Number-one singles in Denmark
Number-one singles in Finland
Number-one singles in Germany
Number-one singles in Portugal
Number-one singles in South Africa
Number-one singles in Sweden
Number-one singles in Switzerland
Ricky Martin songs
Royal Gigolos songs
RPM Top Singles number-one singles
Songs written by Giancarlo Bigazzi
Songs written by Raf (singer)
Sony Music singles
Universal Records singles